Select Milano (SM) is a think-tank aimed at exploring the possibilities of a connection between the City of London and the financial institutions in Milan following Brexit. It was established in 2013. Bepi Pezzulli has been the chairperson since 2016.

Giancarlo Giorgetti, an influential figure in the Northern League, has consolidated links between his party and SM.

References

Think tanks based in Italy